Joseph Mathy (8 July 1944 – 25 August 1969) was a Belgian racing cyclist. He rode in the 1966 Tour de France.

References

External links
 

1944 births
1969 deaths
Belgian male cyclists
Place of birth missing